José Rodríguez or Jose Rodriguez may refer to:

Arts and entertainment
José Antonio Rodríguez (musician) (born 1964), Cordobés flamenco guitarist
José Ignacio Rodríguez (born 1979), Venezuelan model

Law enforcement and crime
Jose Rodriguez (intelligence officer) (born 1948), former director of the U.S. National Clandestine Service of the CIA
José Gonzalo Rodríguez Gacha (1947–1989), Colombian drug lord
José Antonio Rodríguez Vega (1957–2002), Spanish serial killer
José Antonio Elena Rodríguez (d. 2012), shot and killed by a US Border Patrol officer in the Shooting of José Rodríguez

Politics
José Antonio Rodríguez Aldea (1779-1841), Chilean political figure
José Gaspar Rodríguez de Francia (1766–1840), Consul of Paraguay
José Guillermo Rodríguez (born 1960), Puerto Rican politician
José Joaquín Rodríguez Zeledón (1837–1917), president of Costa Rica
José R. Rodríguez (born 1948), Democratic member of the Texas State Senate
José "Tony" Rodríguez Quiles, Puerto Rican politician and representative
José "Chely" Rodríguez, Puerto Rican politician and mayor of Hatillo
Jose V. Rodriguez, Filipino Visayan medical doctor, legislator, and politician from Cebu, Philippines

Sports

Association football
José Antonio Rodríguez (Cuban footballer) (1912-1978), Cuban football midfielder
José Rodríguez (footballer, born 1922), Mexican football midfielder
José Antonio Rodríguez (footballer, born 1938), Spanish football defender
José Rodríguez (footballer, born 1985), Spanish football centre-back
José Antonio Rodríguez (Mexican footballer) (born 1992), Mexican football goalkeeper
José Rodríguez (footballer, born 1994), Spanish football midfielder
José Rodríguez (footballer, born 1995), Colombian football striker
José Guillermo "Memo" Rodriguez (born 1995), American soccer midfielder
José Luis Rodríguez (footballer, born 1997), Uruguayan football defender
José Luis Rodríguez (footballer, born 1998), Panamanian football winger

Baseball
José Rodríguez (infielder) (1894–1953), Cuban baseball player
José Rodríguez (infielder, born 2001), Dominican baseball infielder
José Agustín Rodríguez (1899–?), Cuban baseball player
José Rodríguez (pitcher, born 1974) (born 1974), Puerto Rican baseball player
José Manuel Rodríguez (baseball) (born 1982), Mexican baseball player
José Rodríguez (pitcher, born 1995) (born 1995), Venezuelan baseball player

Boxing
José Alfredo Rodríguez (born 1989), Mexican light flyweight boxer
José Alejandro Rodríguez (born 1988), Mexican lightweight boxer
José Rodríguez (boxer) (born 1967), Puerto Rican boxer

Water sports
José Rodríguez (sailor) (born 1945), Puerto Rican Olympic sailor
José Rodriguez (water polo) (born 1967), Spanish Olympic water polo player
José Antonio Rodríguez (rower) (born 1968), Spanish Olympic rower

Other sports
José Rodríguez (cyclist) (born 1966), Spanish cyclist
José Rodríguez (fencer) (born 1910), Argentine Olympic fencer
José Rodríguez (judoka) (born 1959), Cuban former judoka
José Luis Rodríguez Aguilar (born 1994), Chilean cyclist
José Manuel Rodríguez (athlete) (born 1966), Spanish Paralympic athlete
José Manuel Rodríguez (boccia) (born 1980), Spanish Paralympic boccia player
José Reyes Rodríguez (1896–unknown), Mexican Olympic shooter

Others
Jose Rodriguez (activist) (born 1952), Canal Zone-born peace activist
José Rodríguez Carballo (born 1953), Roman Catholic priest, Minister General of the Order of Friars Minor
José Rodriguez, fictional character in Fifty Shades (novel series)

See also
José Rodrigues (1828–1887), Portuguese painter
Cayetano José Rodríguez (1761–1823), Argentine cleric, journalist and poet
Jose N. Rodriguez (1896–1980), Filipino scientist, inventor of methods for controlling leprosy, gave his name to the Dr. Jose N. Rodriguez Memorial Hospital in Manila
José Luis Rodríguez (disambiguation)